Jerónimo Mihura (6 July 1902 – 10 October 1990) was a Spanish film director who made a number of documentary films. He is also notable for a group of screwball-style comedies such as House of Cards (1943) and My Beloved Juan (1950). He was the brother of the writer Miguel Mihura.

Selected filmography
 House of Cards (1943)
 The Road to Babel (1945)
 In a Corner of Spain (1949)
 They Always Return at Dawn (1949)
 My Beloved Juan (1950)
 I Want to Marry You (1951)

References

Bibliography 
 Labanyi, Jo & Pavlović, Tatjana. A Companion to Spanish Cinema. John Wiley & Sons, 2012.

External links 
 

1902 births
1990 deaths
Spanish film directors
Spanish male writers
Male screenwriters
People from Cádiz
20th-century Spanish screenwriters
20th-century Spanish male writers